Klostergårdens IP is an association football stadium in Lund, Sweden and the home stadium of Lunds BK.

History
Klostergårdens IP was built in 1968 and is named after the neighborhood in which it is located. The attendance record of 5,586 spectators was set in 1985 when Lunds BK played Malmö FF in the Swedish Cup. The stadium was renovated in 2014, which lowered the estimated capacity to 3,650 spectators. The main stand seats approximately 500 people, while the rest of the stadium consists of standing-room terraces. During renovation, the grass turf was also replaced with artificial turf.

References 

Lunds BK
Football venues in Sweden
20th-century establishments in Skåne County